The 2008 Paris–Roubaix was the 106th running of the Paris–Roubaix single-day cycling race, often known as the Hell of the North. Tom Boonen of the  team won in a sprint inside the Roubaix velodrome. Fabian Cancellara was a close second and Alessandro Ballan came third.

Results
April 13, 2008, Compiègne > Roubaix,

The cobblestones

References

External links

Paris–Roubaix
Paris-Roubaix
Paris-Roubaix
Paris-Roubaix